Jean-Lou Paiani (born 13 December 1988 in Sallanches) is a French cyclist from Megève, Rhône-Alpes, France.

Palmares
2009
 1st Stage 2 Tour de l'Avenir
 1st Stage 2 Tour Nivernais Morvan
 6th Paris–Roubaix Espoirs
2012
 2nd Grand Prix de la Ville de Lillers
2014
 1st Stage 1 Paris-Arras Tour (TTT)

References

1988 births
Living people
French male cyclists
Université Savoie-Mont Blanc alumni